Chayanda field (also known as Chayandinskoye field) is a large hydrocarbon resource field, primarily of natural gas and gas condensates. It is located in the Lensky District of the Sakha Republic in Yakutiya.

The Chayanda field is located within the Nepa Arch oil and gas area of the central part of Nepa–Botuoba Anteclise in the southern part of the East Siberian Platform. It is hosted in Vendian sandstone reservoir. Up to 8% of the natural gas is nitrogen. The oil fractions contain heavy crude oil, tar and paraffin.

The field was discovered in 1989.  In 2007, the Federal Mineral Resources Agency of Russia planned to sell the oil development rights of the field separately from the gas rights.  However, later that year the field was included in the list of strategic resources and in April 2008, the research and exploitation licence for the field was granted without a public tender to Gazprom.  Geological prospecting is carried out by Gazprom Geologorazvedka and it should be done by 2015.  Gas production will be operated by Gazprom Dobycha Noyabrsk while Gazprom Neft may become an operator of oil production.

The investment in the field development is about 430 billion roubles (US$13.66 billion). This includes more than 300 gas and 140 oil wells, four pre-treatment units, one comprehensive gas treatment unit, one oil treatment unit, and three booster compressor stations. Production of oil is expected to start in 2014 and production of natural gas in 2019. Produced gas will be transported by the Power of Siberia pipeline. Helium will be separated from natural gas at the Belogorsk plant. Produced helium would be purchased by Matheson and Linde.

References

External links 

 Geological structure of the Chayanda field (in russian:Геологическое строение Чаяндинского ГКМ)

Natural gas fields in Russia
Oil fields of Russia
Gazprom oil and gas fields
Helium